Testouri cheese is a cheese made from sheep milk or goat milk.  It is often shaped like an orange, and is eaten fresh and lightly salted.  Testouri cheese is popular in North Africa and the Near East. Testouri is popular in East Africa and was introduced by the Ottomans after the 15th century.

See also
 List of cheeses

External links
 Foodista

Arab cuisine
Egyptian cheeses
Sheep's-milk cheeses
Goat's-milk cheeses
Middle Eastern cheeses